Classical Otomi is the name used for the Otomi language as spoken in the early centuries of Spanish colonial rule in Mexico and documented by Spanish friars who learned the language in order to catechize the Otomi peoples. During the colonial period, many Otomis learned to write their language in Roman letters. As a consequence, a significant number of documents in Otomi, both secular and religious, exist from the period, and the most well-known documents are the Codices of Huichapan and Jilotepec. Text in classical Otomi is not easily accessible since the Spanish speaking friars failed to differentiate the varied vowel and consonant sounds of the Otomi language.

Friars wrote several grammars, the earliest documented of which was the Arte de la lengua othomí  of Pedro de Cárceres in 1580 (but not published until 1907). In 1605, Alonso de Urbano wrote a trilingual Spanish-Nahuatl-Otomi dictionary, which also included a small set of grammatical notes about Otomi. The grammarian of Nahuatl, Horacio Carochi, is known to have written a grammar of Otomi, but no copies have survived. In the latter half of the eighteenth century, an anonymous Jesuit cleric wrote the grammar Luces del Otomi, and Neve y Molina wrote a dictionary and a grammar.

References

Works cited
 

  
 
 
 
  
 

Otomi language
Oto-Pamean languages
Indigenous languages of Mexico
Otomi, Classical
Otomi